A Bad Girl in Harlem is the second studio album by Danish rock band New Politics, released on May 21, 2013 via RCA Records. The three members moved from Copenhagen to Brooklyn, where the material was recorded. Two singles were released, titled "Harlem" and "Tonight You're Perfect". Allmusic.com called the album 'hooky, infectious pop'.

The track "Harlem" was featured in a 2013 Taco Bell commercial, a Windows 8 commercial, several Frozen trailers, Guitar Hero Live, NHL 14 and promotional spots for America's Got Talent.

Track listing

References

2013 albums
New Politics (band) albums
RCA Records albums